Dejan Joveljić (born 7 August 1999) is a Serbian professional footballer who plays as a striker for Major League Soccer club LA Galaxy and the Serbia national team.

Club career

Red Star Belgrade

2016–17 season
Born in Bijeljina, Bosnia and Herzegovina, Joveljić played with the local club Sloga Junajted, before he joined Serbian top tier club Red Star Belgrade in his early years. After almost 7 years with the club, passing the whole youth categories, Joveljić signed his first professional contract on 16 March 2016, along with several teammates. Joveljić has joined the first team under coach Miodrag Božović in 2016, but failed to play official matches during the 2016–17 Serbian SuperLiga campaign due to mononucleosis he was diagnosed with in August 2016. In the meantime, he was listed in top 60 youth footballers by The Guardian. After he missed the rest of 2016 without training, Joveljić returned to the field in early 2017, playing with youth team until the end of a season. He was also nominated as one of the competitors for the Golden Boy award in 2017.

2017–18 season
In summer 2017, Joveljić presented as one of the club's top 10 youth prospects and passed the whole pre-season training with the first squad. He became a regular member of the first team since the beginning of September 2017, after a furious period in the Serbian youth league. He has been named as the third choice striker behind Richmond Boakye and Aleksandar Pešić. Later, on 19 September same year, Joveljić extended his contract with the club until 2021. He spent his first time in protocol for a senior game sitting on the bench as an unused substitution for a match against Mladost Lučani on 22 October 2017. He made his official debut for Red Star Belgrade on 10 December 2017, replacing Aleksandar Pešić in 70 minute of the Serbian SuperLiga match against Borac Čačak. On 5 May 2018, Joveljić got his first time in starting lineup for a senior game, scoring a twice in 5–0 home victory over Spartak Subotica. Finally, Joveljić scored in the last match of the season against Voždovac on 19 May 2018, for the first trophy in his professional career.

2018–19 season
In summer 2018, after overgrown youth selection, which previously qualified to the 2018–19 UEFA Youth League, Joveljić started new season as a fully senior. Following the complete pre-season period he passed with the first team, Joveljić has been licensed for the 2018–19 UEFA Champions League qualifications. Following both of matches against Spartaks Jūrmala in the first round he missed, Joveljić started an opening match of the 2018–19 Serbian SuperLiga, scoring in 3–0 victory over Dinamo Vranje on 20 July 2018.

Eintracht Frankfurt
On 14 June 2019, Joveljić signed a deal with German side Eintracht Frankfurt for a fee of €4 million.

Loan to Anderlecht
Joveljić joined Belgian club Anderlecht on loan until the end of the season on 31 January 2020.

Loan to Wolfsberger
Joveljić spent the 2020-2021 season on loan at Austrian Bundesliga side Wolfsberger AC. He finished the season as the club’s top scorer.

LA Galaxy
On 5 August 2021, Joveljić signed a four-and-a-half year deal with MLS side LA Galaxy.
He signed as a U22 Initiative player.

International career
After games with Serbian under-16 & under-17 national teams, Joveljić made his debut for under-18 level on 15 December 2015 in a match against Ukraine. Later he missed the whole 2016 due to injury and returned to the team scoring a goal in a match against Uzbekistan on 20 April 2017. Playing for the team, Joveljić noted 6 goals on 6 matches, including games against Czech Republic and France when he scored a twice at each. In August 2017, Joveljić was called into the Serbia U19 squad, when he made a debut at the memorial tournament "Stevan Vilotić – Ćele". Scoring a twice in 3–1 victory over Israel, Joveljić contributed to winning a trophy, after which he was elected for the most prospective player on the tournament. Joveljić got his first call in Serbian under-21 team by coach Goran Đorović in December 2017. He made his debut for the team in away friendly against Qatar on 17 December 2017. While with under-19 level, Joveljić also scored against Bulgaria and Sweden in March 2018, missing to qualify for the 2018 UEFA European Under-19 Championship with Serbia.

He made his debut for Serbia national football team on 7 June 2021 in a friendly against Jamaica.

Style of play
Joveljić is a 1.80 m tall striker, who usually operates as a centre forward, being capable of playing as a winger. He has been started tracked during youth career and named as one of the most prospective players in academy, after which he joined the first team. Later he missed a period due to injury and a lack of weight, so he stayed out of the senior football since the 2016–17 campaign. In his final season with youth team, Joveljić affirmed as a poacher and top goalscorer with several hat-tricks. He was also compared with Argentine footballer Mauro Icardi and a compatriot Luka Jović. Joveljić uses both legs and he is also a good header and penalty taker. Joveljić was named as a man of the match scoring three goals as a captain of the U19 squad in the youth Eternal Derby on 16 November 2017. He collected 33 goals in 14 appearances at total, during the first half-season in Serbian youth league.

Personal life
Turning professionally and due to accumulated liabilities, Joveljić decided to pass private school in Novi Sad. Although he has lived alone in Belgrade, Joveljić accentuated his family as the best support in his life and career. Besides football, Joveljić likes to play billiard and chess, and he is also a Rubik's Cube enthusiast. 39 seconds is his personal record.

Career statistics

Club

International

Honours
Red Star Belgrade
Serbian SuperLiga: 2017–18, 2018–19

References

External links
 
 
 
 

1999 births
Living people
People from Bijeljina
Serbian footballers
Serbia international footballers
Serbia youth international footballers
Serbia under-21 international footballers
Serbs of Bosnia and Herzegovina
Association football forwards
Red Star Belgrade footballers
Eintracht Frankfurt players
R.S.C. Anderlecht players
Wolfsberger AC players
LA Galaxy players
Serbian SuperLiga players
Bundesliga players
Belgian Pro League players
Austrian Football Bundesliga players
Major League Soccer players
Serbian expatriate footballers
Expatriate footballers in Germany
Expatriate footballers in Belgium
Expatriate footballers in Austria
Expatriate soccer players in the United States
Serbian expatriate sportspeople in Austria
Serbian expatriate sportspeople in Belgium
Serbian expatriate sportspeople in Germany
Serbian expatriate sportspeople in the United States